Spain is one of the countries with the largest wind power capacity installed, with over 27 GW in 2020.

History

Spain was an early leader in development of wind power, ranking second after Germany by installed capacity until 2006, when it was surpassed by the United States. 

In November 2009, a wind storm caused wind farms to produce a peak of 53% of total electricity demand (11.546 GW). This was surpassed in November 2011 with a capacity peak of 59% of power demand being generated by wind power. 

In 2009, the largest producer of wind power in Spain was Iberdrola, with 25.5% of capacity, followed by Acciona with 20.9% and NEO Energia (EDP Renewables) with 8.3%.

Following the fallout from the financial crisis in 2008 and the dire straits of the Spanish economy in the subsequent period new installations of new wind turbines all but stagnated between 2012 and 2015, remaining at close to 23,000 MW installed capacity for the entire period. While Spain put expansion on ice, the other world leading countries continued to expand or accelerated new wind turbine installations and by 2015 India had moved ahead of Spain in total installations. 

On 6 February 2013, wind power achieved an earlier record in electricity production, reaching an instantaneous peak of 17,056 MW and an hourly production of 16,918 MWh.

In 2014, a record breaking year for renewable electricity production, wind power accounted for 20.2% of total electricity generation in Spain making it the second most important electricity source after nuclear power (22%) and ahead of coal power (16.5%). In earlier periods wind energy covered 16% of the demand in 2010, 13.8% in 2009 and 11.5% in 2008.

By year end 2015 Spain was the world's fifth biggest producer of wind power with 23,031 MW installed capacity (including 11 MW of wind-hydro capacity), providing 48,118 GWh of power and 19% of the country's total electricity production in that year. 
On windy days, wind power generation has surpassed all other electricity sources in Spain; On 21 November 2015 at 4:50 am, 70.4% of the electricity consumed in Peninsular Spain was covered with wind power energy.

Growth in installed capacity and generation

Regional trends

A 2006 article stated that the intended wind energy capacity to be installed in the autonomous regions by 2010–2011 at 20,000 MW.

Navarra
The US rating agency Standard & Poors, in a 2006 investigation of standard of living in Europe, ranked Navarre, whose primary source of renewable energy was wind power, uppermost among the 17 autonomous regions of Spain. At that time Navarre sustained approximately 70 percent of its electricity needs from renewable energy sources, wind farms being used most extensively, and had a 900-megawatt capacity of installed wind power.

Navarre lacks thermal, nuclear, coal, oil, gas fields, or hefty hydro-electric power stations, but does possess considerable wind renewable resources, which the Government of Navarre pursued to drop its external energy dependence.
Navarre was entirely reliant on imported energy until wind-power development and utilization began progress in 1996.

Galicia
In 2007 Galicia lead Spain in wind power development amongst the autonomous regions for the third consecutive year with an increase in wind power of 264 MW, succeeding Castilla La Mancha (which exceeded its development goal of 1,000MW), Castile and León, Aaragon and Navarre, and the remaining autonomous regions.

Research

Largely concerned with advancing energy efficiency use in Spain, the Institute for Energy Saving and Diversification (IDAE) also seeks to expand renewable energy sources and energies.

Research concerning the production of hydrogen from electrolysis of water by a wind farm began in 2004 at a newly installed laboratory in the Universidad Pública de Navarra under an agreement between Energía Hidroeléctrica de Navarra, Stuart Energy Systems of Canada, and Statkraft of Norway. The lab replicated the power generation environment of a wind farm and examined the effects of an electrolyzer.

Concentrated research is occurring concerning wind measurement in the Albacete region at Higueruela.

Wind power industry
A 2005 report showed the Spanish wind energy sector hosting the involvement of over 500 companies, with approximately 150 wind turbine production plants and their machinery across the Spanish regions. The assets of the Spanish industry were noticed and acted upon by financial analysts, as United States Ernst and Young in 2005 ranked the wind market in Spain among the uppermost in its index of "long-term country attractiveness". Including those indirectly employed in supplying components and services, the total number of jobs supported by Spain's wind industry had reached more than 30 000, and was estimated to double to 60 000 by 2010" (2005).

Gamesa Eólica

Gamesa, based in the Basque Country is a large global wind turbine manufacturer with 13% share by installed power in 2005. The company values the distinctive geographical setting of Spain as a benefit to Spanish companies competing in the global arena. Gamesa Eólica currently operates plants in Spain, The US and China.  It has projects in many other parts of the world including Egypt, Germany, Ireland, Italy, Japan, Korea,  and Portugal. Gamesa opened a manufacturing plant for wind turbine generator blades in Philadelphia, Pennsylvania in 2005, creating 500 part-time building and operations jobs and 236 permanent manufacturing jobs; the building, operation, and upkeep of Gamesa's wind farms, in conjunction with its two Philadelphia offices and production plant, formed about 1,000 jobs in the state over a five-year period. The company seeks expansion into Greece, Taiwan, and the United Kingdom.

Ecotècnia / Alstom Wind

Ecotècnia, established 1981, and by 2005 had 2.1% world market share by installed capacity, with wind turbines in production of up to 1.6MW. In 2009 the company was acquired by Alstom for €350million. The company continued to develop wind turbines; a 3MW machine was installed in a commercial windfarm in 2009. In 2010 the company was renamed Alstom Wind. In 2011/2 the company developed a prototype 6MW permanent magnet gearless generator for offshore applications, in association with LM Wind Power and Converteam.

Acciona Energy

Acciona Energy (Acciona Energía), the biggest global wind-park developer at the time, operated in Australia, Canada, France, Germany, Morocco, Spain, and the United States. The company credited its success to its initial stages in Navarre during 1994. Its line of work involved wind-farm operation, turbine manufacture, and the development of wind-power plants, and the company intended to expand into China, Ireland, and the United Kingdom.

Iberdrola

Iberdrola held functioning facilities in Brazil, France, Greece, Italy, Mexico, Portugal, Spain, the United States and the United Kingdom, and  continued to develop wind farms in Europe and Latin America.

As of 2008, Iberdrola plans to develop six offshore wind farm projects with a combined generation capacity of 3000 MW at locations off the coasts of the Spanish Atlantic provinces of Cadiz, Huelva and the Mediterranean province of Castellon.

MTorres
MTorres initiated their activities in the Wing Energy field in 1998, with the launch of their newly developed Wind Turbine TWT-1.5/70, a 1500 KW variable-speed direct-drive multipole Wind Turbine with a full-power converter and a 70 meters rotor diameter.

Exports
The national Spanish wind energy industry began exporting its wind generators by forming contracts for the erection of wind farms in China, India, and Mexico, as well as Cuba, where work began in 1998 (2007). They also had contracts at a highly developed stage with Portugal, Turkey, Tunisia, Egypt, Brazil, and Argentina.

The wind energy capacity for major companies in Spain was the following as of 2007: Gamesa Eólica, 3281 MW; Made, 803 MW; Neg Micon, 715 MW; Ecotècnia, 446 MW; G. Electric, 343 MW; Izar-Bonus, 317 MW; Desa & AWP, 121 MW; Enercon, 58 MW; Lagerwey, 38 MW; and Others, 113 MW (2007).

Future development
Three factors will control the further progress of wind power development in Spain: the capability of the wind farms network to hold all the electricity harnessed by wind power, predominantly in off-peak times, the cost of energy, and the environmental effect that the abundance of wind farm development in Spain could turn out. The Spanish wind power industry will be confronted with the following issues in the immediate future:

formulating its development to be congruent with required supply agreements by the national electricity supply operator
guaranteeing that the installation of wind farms occurs with recognition of the environment
synchronizing wind power development of the 17 autonomous regions
trimming down the investment costs to acquire sufficient returns with declining energy prices in the upcoming years.

It is also noteworthy that the supportive Spanish policies for wind power development have resulted in severe competition for construction sites among major companies. Political leaders in the autonomous communities have been frazzled by the numerous applications for wind farm construction.  Local possession of wind power is not present in Spain, but does not appear to take away from further development of wind power in Spain since a much smaller and weaker quantity of local anti-wind farm grid population inhabits the country.

However, a further obstacle concerning wind power development needs to be tackled before Spain can achieve these ambitious objectives: construction of a central control center for all the Spanish wind farms, analogous to the control center used for traditional power plants.

Opposition
With some exceptions, there has been little opposition to the installation of inland wind parks. However, the projects to build offshore parks have been more controversial.

The proposal of building the biggest offshore wind power production facility in the world in southwestern Spain on the spot of the 1805 Battle of Trafalgar.  has been met with strong opposition from the towns in the coast of Cádiz, who fear for tourism and fisheries in the area. There have also been complaints by the British, who claim that the area is a war grave and that any development of the area could destroy archaeological evidence of the historic battle.

See also

Renewable energy in Spain
Electricity sector in Spain
Renewable energy by country
Wind power in the European Union
Renewable energy commercialization

References

External links

Spanish Wind Energy Association
Spain's gain from wind power is plain to see
Oil makes wind power competitive: Spanish utilities
Wind power meets record demand in Spain: industry group
Wind production in Spain by date
Percentage of wind production in Spain by date

 
Spain

fr:Électricité en Espagne#Énergie éolienne